Route 220 or Highway 220 may refer to:

Australia
 Sunraysia Highway

Canada
 Manitoba Provincial Road 220
 Newfoundland and Labrador Route 220
 Prince Edward Island Route 220
 Quebec Route 220
 Saskatchewan Highway 220

China
 China National Highway 220 (G220)

Costa Rica
 National Route 220

Japan
 Japan National Route 220

United Kingdom
 A220 road

United States
 Interstate 220
 U.S. Route 220
 Arkansas Highway 220
 California State Route 220
 Connecticut Route 220
 Florida State Road 220 (former)
 Georgia State Route 220
Hawaii Route 220
 Iowa Highway 220
Kentucky Route 220
 Maine State Route 220
 Massachusetts Route 220
 Minnesota State Highway 220
 Montana Secondary Highway 220
 New Mexico State Road 220
 New York State Route 220
 Ohio State Route 220
 Oregon Route 220 (former)
 Tennessee State Route 220
 Texas State Highway 220
 Utah State Route 220 (former)
 Washington State Route 220 (former)
 Wyoming Highway 220